Dahegam is one of the 182 Legislative Assembly constituencies of Gujarat state in India. It is part of Gandhinagar district.

List of segments

This assembly seat represents the following segments,

 Dahegam Taluka

Members of Legislative Assembly

Election results

2022

2017

2012

See also
 List of constituencies of the Gujarat Legislative Assembly
 Gandhinagar district

References

External links
 

Assembly constituencies of Gujarat
Gandhinagar district